The German language term Stab (literal translation: "staff") was used during World War II to designate a headquarters unit of the German Luftwaffe (air force). There were Stab units at the level of a Gruppe or Geschwader – units that were equivalent to wings and groups in the air forces of the English-speaking world. Stab units directly controlled aircraft as well as controlling those belonging to subordinate units.

These command units used the mandated blue or green "staff aircraft" colour for the third character (the individual aircraft's letter) of their alphanumeric  Geschwaderkennung wing code, to distinguish their aircraft from the rest of air units in the same unit. These units were divided in the following form, for the fourth and last character normally used to distinguish individual Staffeln (squadrons) from the letter "H" onwards in Luftwaffe wing codes:

Geschwader Stab = A (third letter blue)
Stab I Gruppe ("Staff Unit, I Group") = B (third letter green)
Stab II Gruppe = C (third letter green)
Stab III Gruppe = D (third letter green)
Stab IV Gruppe = F (third letter green)
Stab V Gruppe = G (third letter green)

On some occasions they also used letters Q, I, J, W and others, or numbers, but these were used less commonly. As day fighter Jagdgeschwader combat wings did not use the Geschwaderkennung four-character alphanumeric code system for aircraft identification, as one example, the all-jet Jagdgeschwader 7 Nowotny and piston-engined Jagdgeschwader 300 Wilde Sau fighter wings, these used the red-blue or blue-white-blue Reich Defense (German Reich metropolitan defense) rear fuselage bands of 90 cm total width respectively, for their Stabsschwarm units.  Under the cockpit, the rank of the air commander might have been indicated via a rank sign, with or without additional letters as mentioned above.

For example:

 An airplane codified "A", green in colour, with D/St.III/St.G.77, indicated it was a member of Stab III of Stukageschwader (Dive Bomber Wing) No. 77.
 An airplane codified "G", green in colour, with a little white tank (Panzer) painting near the cockpit, and S.G. 1, indicated it was a member of Stab of Schlachtgeschwader (Ground Attack Wing) no. 1.

See also 
Organization of the Luftwaffe (1933–1945)
World War II

References

Luftwaffe